Smeringopina is a genus of African cellar spiders that was first described by O. Kraus in 1957.

Species
 it contains forty-four species, found only in Africa:
Smeringopina africana (Thorell, 1899) – West Africa
Smeringopina ankasa Huber, 2013 – Ghana, Ivory Coast, Liberia
Smeringopina armata (Thorell, 1899) – Cameroon
Smeringopina attuleh Huber, 2013 – Cameroon
Smeringopina bamenda Huber, 2013 – Cameroon
Smeringopina bayaka Huber, 2013 – Gabon
Smeringopina belinga Huber, 2013 – Gabon
Smeringopina beninensis Kraus, 1957 (type) – Benin, Nigeria
Smeringopina bineti (Millot, 1941) – Guinea
Smeringopina bioko Huber, 2013 – Equatorial Guinea (Bioko)
Smeringopina bomfobiri Huber, 2013 – Ghana
Smeringopina bwiti Huber, 2013 – Gabon
Smeringopina camerunensis Kraus, 1957 – Cameroon
Smeringopina chaillu Huber, 2013 – Gabon
Smeringopina cornigera (Simon, 1907) – Cameroon
Smeringopina djidji Huber, 2013 – Gabon
Smeringopina ebolowa Huber, 2013 – Cameroon
Smeringopina essotah Huber, 2013 – Cameroon
Smeringopina etome Huber, 2013 – Cameroon
Smeringopina fang Huber, 2013 – Gabon
Smeringopina fon Huber, 2013 – Benin, São Tomé and Príncipe, Nigeria
Smeringopina guineensis (Millot, 1941) – Guinea, Liberia
Smeringopina ibadan Huber, 2013 – Nigeria
Smeringopina iboga Huber, 2013 – Gabon
Smeringopina kala Huber, 2013 – Cameroon, Equatorial Guinea
Smeringopina kikongo Huber, 2013 – Congo
Smeringopina kinguele Huber, 2013 – Gabon
Smeringopina kribi Huber, 2013 – Cameroon
Smeringopina lekoni Huber, 2013 – Gabon
Smeringopina luki Huber, 2013 – Congo
Smeringopina mayebout Huber, 2013 – Gabon
Smeringopina mbouda Huber, 2013 – Cameroon
Smeringopina mohoba Huber, 2013 – Gabon
Smeringopina moudouma Huber, 2013 – Gabon
Smeringopina ndjole Huber, 2013 – Gabon
Smeringopina ngungu Huber, 2013 – Congo
Smeringopina nyasoso Huber, 2013 – Cameroon
Smeringopina ogooue Huber, 2013 – Gabon
Smeringopina pulchra (Millot, 1941) – West Africa
Smeringopina sahoue Huber, 2013 – Gabon
Smeringopina simintang Huber, 2013 – Gabon
Smeringopina simplex Kraus, 1957 – Cameroon
Smeringopina tchimbele Huber, 2013 – Gabon
Smeringopina tebe Huber, 2013 – Gabon

See also
 List of Pholcidae species

References

Araneomorphae genera
Pholcidae
Spiders of Africa